Ghovil (also Romanized as Ghovīl; also known as Qovīl-e Bālā) is a village in Chah Salem Rural District, in the Central District of Omidiyeh County, Khuzestan Province, Iran. At the 2006 census, its population was 30, in 6 families.

References 

Populated places in Omidiyeh County